Jan Heylen (born 1 May 1980 in Geel) is a championship-winning Belgian racing driver, based out of Tampa, Florida.

Racing career

Early career (1992-2004)
He began karting in 1992, and worked his way up through various feeder series through the years including the British Formula Ford Winter Series (2000), British Formula Ford Championship (2001), Formula Ford Festival, UK Formula Ford Zetec Championship (2002), Formula 3 Spain and Euro (2003), and German Formula 3 (2004). In 2005, he was crowned the Eurocup Mégane Trophy champion. He also won the 2002 Formula Ford Festival at Brands Hatch and has competed in the Formula Three Euroseries. In 2004 Heylen drove in the first four Formula 3000 races of the season with Team Astromega before being replaced by Olivier Tielemans. Following the changeup, Heylen returned to the German Formula 3 series and finished third in the championship with six wins and eight podium finishes.

European Sports Car Racing (2005-2011)
Through still racing in open-wheel machinery, Heylen started adding sports cars to his racing resume in 2005. That year, he also competed in the Eurocup Megane Trophy, earning seven wins. He also participated in the 24 Hours of Zolder, finishing first with Selleslagh Racing Team. The following season, he raced in a one-off at Spa-Francorchamps in Belcar GT, a national sports car racing championship in Belgium, again securing victory. In 2008, he returned to the 24 Hours of Zolder and Belcar GT with AD sport, racing alongside future Porsche Factory driver Laurens Vanthoor. The 2009 season saw his final attempts at the 24 Hours of Zolder and Spa, resulting in a DNF with AD Sport, and a fourth-place finish with Prospeed Competition, respectively. In 2011, Heylen returned to Prospeed Competition, with co-driver Petri Lappalainen, and the pair earned four top-ten finishes in twelve events, with a season-best of seventh place at Zandvoort, concluding Heylen's full-season efforts in Europe.

Champ Car World Series (2006 & 2007)
He beat out Nicky Pastorelli for the 2006 Champ Car World Series season at Dale Coyne Racing by bringing sponsorship from the Muermans Group and BergHOFF Worldwide. With Cristiano da Matta as his teammate, Heylen scored a fifth-place finish at the Cleveland Grand Prix, the team's best result to date. Heylen ended the season 14th in the standings with a best finish of fifth at the Cleveland Grand Prix. He was unable to find a ride for the first three races of the 2007 season, but was brought on to Conquest Racing to replace Matt Halliday from the fourth race onwards. Despite finishing second—the team's top finish at the time—at TT Circuit Assen, the race would be his final one for the team as he was replaced for the final two races by funded driver Nelson Philippe.

North American Sports Car Racing Beginnings (2008-2013)
In 2008 Heylen began his North American sports car racing career, driving in the first two Grand-Am Rolex Sports Car Series races, including the 24 Hours of Daytona in Synergy Racing's Porsche 911 in the GT-class. With co-drivers Mark Greenberg, Damien Faulkner, and Lance Arnold, the team finished sixth in class. Heylen returned to the team for the Homestead-Miami round with Steve Johnson, but the pair was unable to finish the race. He went back to Europe in 2011 for a full season in FIA GT, but came back to the United States the following year to compete in the GRAND-AM Rolex Sports Car Series and American Le Mans Series, the top two sports car racing series in North America. In 2012, Heylen competed in a Trans-Am Series race in the GGT class and two Continental Tire Sports Car Challenge races driving a Dodge Challenger, three Rolex Sports Car Series GT-class races in a Dodge Viper, one American Le Mans Series LMP2-class race for Conquest Endurance, and one Pirelli World Challenge race. After running select races in 2012, Heylen raced the majority of the 2013 season in the American Le Mans Series alongside Mike Hedlund in the JDX Porsche. The pair earned three podium finishes that season at Lime Rock Park, downtown Baltimore, and Road Atlanta's Petit Le Mans.

Indy Lights (2010)
In 2009 he signed on to compete in the Firestone Indy Lights series, driving for Team E. However, the team nor Heylen never appeared on track all season. He attended the 2010 IndyCar Series preseason meetings with Conquest Racing but did not announce a deal with the team. However, the 2010 season saw him drive for Team E, which never happened in 2009, in the 2010 Indy Lights season opener in St. Petersburg. Ironically, he finished second, as he did in his final Champ Car race, to Lights rookie Jean-Karl Vernay. In 2011 Heylen drove in the 24 Hours of Daytona for Starworks Motorsport and made six starts in the FIA GT3 European Championship for Prospeed Competition and finished 27th in points.

IMSA WeatherTech SportsCar Championship and SRO America (2014-Present)
(Formally the TUDOR United SportsCar Championship and Pirelli World Challenge)

The 2014 season marked the unification of the GRAND-AM Series and American Le Mans Series, creating the TUDOR United SportsCar Championship. With the exception of the Twelve Hours of Sebring, where he ran with RumBum Racing, Heylen ran the entire season with Snow Racing, in a Porsche fielded by Wright Motorsports. Heylen and co-drivers Madison Snow and Marco Seefried finished in third place in the Rolex 24 At Daytona, as one of only two GTD entries to use only three drivers. Despite only receiving the car weeks before the race, the No. 58 Porsche 911 stayed in the top five for the entirety of the race. The full-season pair of Heylen and Snow returned to the podium again at Road America, then a final time at the season finale, Petit Le Mans, with Patrick Dempsey as the third driver. In 2015, Heylen returned to Wright, running in four races alongside Snow. The highlight of the year came at the Rolex 24 At Daytona, when the pair podiumed for the second consecutive year at the endurance event, this time with co-drivers Patrick Dempsey and Phillip Eng.

While he only competed in one event in 2016, Heylen came back in 2017 with Wright Motorsports for a full season in the Pirelli World Challenge Sprint X GT Pro/Am championship, racing alongside Michael Schein. With three wins and seven podiums, the pair finished second in the team and driver championships. He also participated in three IMSA WeatherTech SportsCar Championship races with TRG and Park Place Motorsports, earning a best finish of fifth place at the Long Beach Grand Prix.

The 2018 and 2019 seasons brought more partial runs to Heylen's resume, running select events in the Continental Tire SportsCar Challenge, the 24H GT Series at Circuit of the Americas, the Chase for the Trigon Trophy TA2 Series, the IMSA Prototype Challenge Presented by Mazda, and the Pirelli GT4 America SprintX Pro/Am championships with VOLT Racing, RS1, Wright Motorsports, and Baker Racing.

Despite the worldwide COVID-19 pandemic and changes to the racing calendar, Heylen's career gained momentum in 2020, where he raced in two full-season efforts and two partial efforts with three different teams. In the Pirelli GT4 America SprintX, where the format involves two drivers sharing a car for a sprint race, he raced again with RS1 alongside Charlie Belluardo. The pair earned four podium finishes at Circuit of the Americas and Indianapolis Motor Speedway. In Michelin Pilot Challenge (formerly Continental Tire SportsCar Challenge), he joined BGB Motorsport with Thomas Collingwood, where the pair had a best-place result of seventh in the 10-race championship. His partnership with Wright Motorsports continued to include three races in the IMSA WeatherTech SportsCar Championship and three in the GT World Challenge America Pro/Am Championship. In IMSA, Heylen joined Ryan Hardwick and Porsche Factory driver Patrick Long for three endurance events, earning a third-place finish at Road Atlanta, and the team's first IMSA victory at the 12 Hours of Sebring. Standing in for full-season driver Max Root, Heylen joined Wright driver Fred Poordad for the Circuit of the Americas doubleheader, bringing the No. 20 Porsche 911 GT3 R to two podium finishes. At the season finale event of the Intercontinental GT Challenge's Indianapolis 8 Hour, he joined Poordad and Root, securing victory in the silver class.

Heylen raced solely Wright Motorsport Porsche machinery in 2021, in what proved to be a stand-out year for the Belgian race car driver. In Michelin Pilot Challenge, Heylen signed for a full season with co-driver Ryan Hardwick, through Hardwick had to withdraw out of two events in which Max Root stepped in. After a series of five podium finishes, the No. 16 Wright Motorsports Porsche earned its first of three victories at WeatherTech Raceway Laguna Seca, gaining a foothold in the championship battle against the Turner Motorsports BMW. The championship titles were decided at the season finale at Road America in dramatic fashion when aggressive racing by the BMW withdrew the team from contention and the No. 16 Wright Porsche sailed to victory. With the win, Wright Motorsports became the Team Champion, and Heylen the Driver Champion. In the IMSA WeatherTech SportsCar Championship, Heylen joined fulls season drivers Patrick Long and Trent Hindman in the No. 16 Porshe 911 GT3 R in the GTD class for the four endurance races, earning a second-place finish at the Twelve Hours of Sebring. The trio finished the year with a fifth-place finish at Petit Le Mans, securing the 2021 Michelin Endurance Cup, the endurance championship title within the full-season championship. In GT World Challenge America, Heylen returned to the No. 20 Porsche 911 GT3 R with Fred Poordad for a full-season, finishing in the top five for all thirteen races. The pair earned the 2021 Drivers' Championship title and Wright Motorsports the Team Championship title. The nine championship titles in 2021 earned Heylen the prestigious Porsche Cup award, an annual honor given to the most successful private Porsche driver since 1970. In addition to a trophy to accompany the honor, Heylen was gifted a new Porsche sportscar as well.

In December 2021, Wright Motorsports announced Heylen would run another full season alongside Hardwick, racing the No. 16 Porsche 911 GT3 R in the IMSA WeatherTech SportsCar Championship.

Race Steward
In addition to being a racing driver, Heylen also acted as Race Director. In 2008 and 2009, Heylen acted as the Volkswagen Jetta TDI Cup chief driving instructor, overseeing the training of 30 drivers between the ages of 17 and 26, hoping to make it in professional sports car racing. The 2008 season was captured and made into a Reality television documentary called Racing Under Green. In the 2019 season, Heylen returned to a management role, joining the Mazda Road to Indy's USF2000 series as Race Director.

He currently resides in Tampa, Florida.

Motorsports career results

Complete Formula 3 Euro Series results

Complete International Formula 3000 results

American open–wheel racing results

Champ Car

Indy Lights

GT4 America

IMSA Prototype Challenge

Michelin Pilot Challenge Results

GT World Challenge America (Formally Pirelli World Challenge)

Intercontinental GT Challenge 8 Hour

WeatherTech Sports Series

American Le Mans Series

IMSA
Formally TUDOR United SportsCar Championship now IMSA WeatherTech SportsCar Championship

Complete 24 Hours of Le Mans results

References

External links

Heylen's MySpace profile
Heylen's stats at ChampCarStats.com

1980 births
Living people
Champ Car drivers
Belgian racing drivers
Rolex Sports Car Series drivers
FIA GT Championship drivers
International Formula 3000 drivers
Formula 3 Euro Series drivers
German Formula Three Championship drivers
Euroformula Open Championship drivers
Formula Ford drivers
Indy Lights drivers
Eurocup Mégane Trophy drivers
24 Hours of Daytona drivers
Trans-Am Series drivers
American Le Mans Series drivers
People from Geel
Blancpain Endurance Series drivers
WeatherTech SportsCar Championship drivers
24 Hours of Spa drivers
24H Series drivers
GT World Challenge America drivers
Sportspeople from Antwerp Province
24 Hours of Le Mans drivers
Karting World Championship drivers
Kolles Racing drivers
Team Astromega drivers
Dale Coyne Racing drivers
Conquest Racing drivers
Porsche Motorsports drivers
Racing Engineering drivers
Comtec Racing drivers
Starworks Motorsport drivers
Nürburgring 24 Hours drivers
Michelin Pilot Challenge drivers